Hecla is a ghost town in Laramie County in the U.S. state of Wyoming. 

Although not posted, what remains of the stamping and smelting facilities is located on private property.

History

The area around Hecla was mined for copper from the 1860s to the 1960s by the Calumet and Hecla Mining Company which was a merger between the Calumet Company and the Hecla company. It became one of the major copper mining companies in the United States.

At one point, Hecla was being considered as a stop for the Union Pacific Railroad, but it didn't gain enough attention and the proposal was dropped.

Literature

In the book Hell Hole by Hunter Shea, the main character is asked by President Teddy Roosevelt to investigate a mine in Hecla.

References

External links

Hell Hole by Hunter Shea

Populated places in Laramie County, Wyoming
Ghost towns in Wyoming